Maligny may refer to:

Maligny, Côte-d'Or, a commune in the French region of Bourgogne
Maligny, Yonne, a commune in the French region of Bourgogne